Żelice may refer to the following places:
Żelice, Greater Poland Voivodeship (west-central Poland)
Żelice, Pomeranian Voivodeship (north Poland)
Żelice, West Pomeranian Voivodeship (north-west Poland)